Sbanken ASA is a Norwegian online bank headquartered in Bergen.

The CEO is Øyvind Thomassen.

History 
The bank was founded by Skandia as a branch of its existing bank in Sweden, Skandiabanken, on April 27, 2000, and became the first online-only bank in Norway. Skandiabanken Norway was separated from Skandiabanken Sweden and further Skandia group in 2015, becoming its own company Skandiabanken ASA, and was consequently renamed Sbanken ASA on November 6, 2017.

In August 2020, Sbanken had 460,000 customers, and as of 31 December 2019, it had total assets of approx. 93 billion. The bank has over 400 employees.

Sbanken ASA is listed on the Oslo Stock Exchange.

In and by mid 2022 after decisions made by norwegian government bureau for complaints on decisions made by the Norwegian government department for commerce and competition in the summer of 2022 the Norwegian bank giant DNB ( Den Norske Bank) was finally allowed to buy and take over its competitor, despite the norwegian government office for competition banning the take over attempt earlier in the year and stopping the takeover in 2021.

External links 
Official website
Sbanken on Facebook
 Sbanken on Instagram

References

Banks of Norway
Banks established in 2000
Norwegian companies established in 2000
Companies based in Bergen
Companies listed on the Oslo Stock Exchange
Online banks